The Boer War is a 1914 film, directed by George Melford about the Second Boer War.

Cast
Edward Clisbee as General Lambert, retired
Jane Wolfe	as Mrs. Lambert
Marin Sais as Jane Lambert, their daughter
William Brunton as Lt. Jack Lambert, their son
Lawrence Peyton as Captain Doane 
William H. West as Jaubert, a Boer general

References

External links

1914 films
American silent feature films
Films directed by George Melford
American black-and-white films
Second Boer War films
1910s American films